Marxuach (modern standandardized spelling: Marxuac) is a Catalan (originally from Occitania) surname shared by the following people:

Javier Grillo-Marxuach
Francisco J. Marxuach
Pompeyo Oliu Marxuach
Acisclo Marxuach y Plumey
José María Marxuach Echavarría
Rafael Marxuach y Abrams 
Teófilo Marxuach y Plumey
Teófilo Villavicencio y Marxuach
Gilberto José Marxuach

External links
 Distribución territorial de apellidos en España, según Instituto Nacional de Estadística (Territorial distribution of surnames)

Catalan-language surnames